The piriformis nerve, also known as the nerve to piriformis, is the peripheral nerve that innervates the piriformis muscle.

Structure
The piriformis nerve to piriformis originates from the ventral rami of S1 and S2 in the sacral plexus. It enters the anterior surface of the piriformis muscle. This nerve may be double. This nerve is not to be confused with the inferior gluteal nerve, which also arises from posterior divisions of the first and second sacral ventral rami (L5, S1, S2).

Function 
The piriformis nerve innervates the piriformis muscle.

See also
 Piriformis
 Sacral plexus

References 

홍재기

Nerves of the lower limb and lower torso